Dragonfall 5 is a series of children's science fiction novels written by Brian Earnshaw during the 1970s and  illustrated by Simon Stern.

Overview
The series takes place in the 3rd millennium and concerns a (presumably British) family made up of Tim, Sanchez, Old Elias and Big Mother, traveling in the eponymous spaceship, the Dragonfall 5.  They transport goods, passengers and other items to a variety of worlds. Apart from the four humans, the crew consist of a pet dog called Jerk, who is a breed of flying hounds who can glide using his long ears. They also have several small rodent-like animals called Minims. The family always work in groups of three, and can jointly translate most alien languages. In the Dragonfall 5 and the Royal Beast there were at least six Minims on the ship.

Books
 Dragonfall 5 and the Royal Beast (1972): Transporting a valuable and rare animal "The Royal Beast", the crew of Dragonfall 5 set down on a lush forest world to re-stock on food. However the natives have their eyes on the cargo...
 Dragonfall 5 and the Space Cowboys (1972): Their engine in need of repair, Dragonfall 5 drifts into a world made of asteroids. They learn it was once a planet, until a war with 'Outsiders' broke the world into chunks, still with atmosphere. Now space cowboys fly punch-riders over their herds of cattle across the green asteroids. But the search is on for a treasure hidden at the end of a trail of clues...
 Dragonfall 5 and the Empty Planet (1973): Tim and his brother Sanchez have to attend school on the Empty Planet, a place of whispering trees and musical rocks, from which the last inhabitants vanished without a trace.
 Dragonfall 5 and the Hijackers (1974): An old enemy plans to take control of Dragonfall 5 while they are on the water world of seals and walruses.
 Dragonfall 5 and the Master Mind (1975): It's climate system expertly managed by a Super Computer, a planet of rabbits is puzzled by the sudden flooding that has broken out. Dragonfall 5 is hired to ship grain to the rabbit clans, split into White and Black tribes, but Tim and Sanchez will be required to travel deep into the flooded tunnels to seek out the Master Mind for answers.
 Dragonfall 5 and the Super Horse (1977): A new star-drive has been developed, but with questions raised about its safety, the crew of Dragonfall 5 are hired to be investigators to the world of the horses.
 Dragonfall 5 and the Haunted World (1979): Transporting intergalactic arms dealers, the crew of Dragonfall 5 must take a voyage to the Haunted World to raise much-needed funds. It is a place of sand and ghosts, a world that almost ran out of water, and the people who died or were lost in attempts to escape the dying planet.

External links
 Brian Earnshaw Bibliography

Science fiction book series
Series of children's books
Novels by Brian Earnshaw